Örjan Svahn is a Swedish ski-orienteering competitor and world champion. He won a gold medal in the classic distance at the World Ski Orienteering Championships in Velingrad in 1977, and received a gold medal with the Swedish relay team.

References

Year of birth missing (living people)
Living people
Swedish orienteers
Male orienteers
Ski-orienteers